Atlantic Crossing 1 (AC-1) is an optical submarine telecommunications cable system linking the United States and three European countries. It transports speech and data traffic between the U.S., the U.K., the Netherlands and Germany. It is one of several transatlantic communications cables. It was operated by American company Level 3 Communications and Irish company Tyco International, until their respective mergers in 2017 and 2016 with other companies.

It has landing points in:
 Brookhaven Cable Station, Shirley, New York, United States
 Land's End Cable Station, England, United Kingdom
 Westerland Cable Station, Schleswig-Holstein, Germany
 KPN Telecom cable station, Beverwijk, Netherlands

References

External links
 
 Global Crossing Press Release
 Global Crossing Completes Upgrade on Trans-Atlantic Route
VSNL Int. Map (Flash only)

Submarine communications cables in the North Atlantic Ocean
Submarine communications cables in the English Channel
Submarine communications cables in the North Sea
1999 establishments in England
1999 establishments in Germany
1999 establishments in the Netherlands
1999 establishments in New York (state)